A bullion coin is a coin struck from refined precious metal (bullion) and kept as a store of value or an investment rather than used in day-to-day commerce. A bullion coin is distinguished by an explicit statement of weight (or mass) and fineness on the coin; this is because the weight and composition of coins intended for legal tender is specified in the coinage laws of the issuing nation, and therefore there is no need for an explicit statement on the coins themselves.

The United Kingdom defines investment coins more specifically as coins that have been minted after 1800, have a purity of not less than 900 thousandths and are, or have been, legal tender in their country of origin. Under United States law, "coins" that fail the last of these requirements are not coins at all, and must be advertised as "rounds" instead. 

Bullion coins sell for a premium over the market price of the metal on the commodities exchanges. Reasons include their comparative small size and the costs associated with manufacture, storage and distribution. The amount of the premium varies depending on the coin's type and weight and the precious metal. The premium also is affected by prevailing demand. Depending on a number of factors, numismatic value may also have a direct influence on the price of a bullion coin.

The American Eagle and Canadian Maple Leaf series are the only coins available in gold, silver, platinum, and palladium.

See also

Bullion
Inflation hedge
List of bullion coins
Gold coin
Palladium coin
Platinum coin
Silver coin

References

External links